William Garrett (9 January 1876 – 16 February 1953) was an English cricketer. He played for Essex between 1900 and 1903.

References

External links

1876 births
1953 deaths
English cricketers
Essex cricketers
People from Camberwell
Cricketers from Greater London
People from Buckhurst Hill